Niha may refer to:

Places

Lebanon
 Niha, Chouf
 Fortress of Niha
 Niha, Zahlé
 Hosn Niha, an archaeological site
 Niha, Batroun

Syria
 Niha, Idlib
 Niha, Tartus

Other uses
Nepal Ice Hockey Association (NIHA)

See also

 Nam Niha, a village in Iran
 Nias people, also known as Ono Niha